Nanning West railway station was a railway station in Xixiangtang District, Nanning, Guangxi, China. The station is an intermediate stop on the Nanning–Kunming high-speed railway. The station has two side platforms.

History
The station was initially called Tanluo, but was renamed prior to opening. The station was opened on the first stage of the Nanning–Kunming high-speed railway on 15 May 2016. The initial service was two trains in each direction per day.

References

Railway stations in Guangxi
Railway stations in China opened in 2016
Stations on the Nanning–Kunming high-speed railway